The 2022–23 CSA Women's Provincial Programme is the ongoing 27th edition of South Africa's provincial one-day cricket tournament. The tournament will run from September 2022 to April 2023, with 16 teams competing in three divisions. North West are the defending champions.

Competition format
The 16 teams are divided into three divisions: a top division named "Top 6", and two lower divisions, Pools A and B. Teams in Pools A and B play each other team in their group once in a round-robin format, whilst teams in the Top 6 league play each other team in their group twice. Matches are played using a one day format, with 50 overs per side.

The winner of the Top 6 league will be crowned the Champions. The winners of Pools A and B will play off for promotion. The tournament runs concurrently with the 2022–23 CSA Women's Provincial T20 Competition, with matches played either the day before or day after the corresponding encounter between two teams in the T20 tournament.

The groups work on a points system with positions being based on the total points. Points are awarded as follows:

Win: 4 points. 
Tie: 3 points. 
Loss: 0 points.
Abandoned/No Result: 2 points.
Bonus Point: 1 bonus point available per match.

Teams

Tables

Top 6

Pool A

Pool B

References

CSA Women's Provincial Programme
Domestic cricket competitions in 2022–23
2022–23 South African cricket season
2022 in South African women's sport
2023 in South African women's sport